Tatanka Wanbli Sapa Xila Sabe Means (born February 19, 1985) is a Native American activist, actor, boxer, comedian, and entrepreneur of Oglala Lakota, Omaha, Yankton Dakota and Diné descent. He is best known for his roles in Saints & Strangers and Tiger Eyes.

Acting career

Means' first screen role was in 2004 playing lead stunt double in the film Black Cloud, which was shot in the same gym where he had previously trained as a boxer. He has since had major roles in several films and TV series. In the miniseries Into the West (2005) he played Crazy Horse. In More Than Frybread (2012), he played Buddy Begay, a "hip-hop Navajo fry-bread rock star" who sells fry-bread from a truck on the reservation. A reviewer who described it as the "showiest part" in the film said, "Means .. overdoes it a little ... but that's part of Buddy's personality."

In Tiger Eyes (2012), based on the novel by Judy Blume, he played Wolf Ortiz, a Native American boy who shows the main character his ancestral lands and introduces her to his culture. Critics have applauded Means' casting and performance in Tiger Eyes. One described him as "quietly affecting"; another said that he "could have come off as a holy-native cliche, but instead seems entirely real"; and another wrote that he was "superbly cast ... [with] a voice that can quickly disarm and charm a newcomer ... it's clear that we're seeing something almost never seen in a contemporary feature film, which is an utterly authentic representation of a New Mexican." Another review said he is "New Mexican down to his body language and the expression in his eyes .. a thrill to behold on screen."

Other major roles include Hobbamock, an elite Pokanoket warrior, in Saints & Strangers (2015), Delvin in Neither Wolf Nor Dog (2016), and Charges the Enemy in The Son. Means has also appeared in The Burrowers (2008) as 'Tall Ute', Sedona (2011) as Chuck, The Host (2013), Banshee (2014) as 'Hoyt Rivers', A Million Ways to Die in the West (2014), The Night Shift (2014-2015), Maze Runner: The Scorch Trials (2015), and Graves (2016).

In 2019, he appears in Once Upon a River as Bernard Crane, in Montford: The Chickasaw Rancher as Rising Wolf, and in The Dust Monologues as The Jackrabbit. Also in 2019, he is cast in a film version of Alex Kershaw's book The Liberator, as Private Thomas Otaktay, a Lakota soldier fighting with the 157th Field Artillery Regiment during World War II.

Means takes pride in portraying Native men as modern, complex people rather than the racist or stereotypical characters sometimes found in Hollywood films.

Acting awards

For his role as Wolf in Tiger Eyes, Means received the award of Best Supporting Actor in the American Indian Film Festival, Best Actor in a Motion Picture at the Red Nation Film Festival, and Tamalewood Award at the Santa Fe Independent Film Festival. He has also won Best Actor at the Nevada Film Festival for his role as Jim Sundell in Derby Kings (2012) and Best Male Actor at the Dreamspeakers Film Festival, Edmonton, Alberta, for the same film.

Comedy career

As a comedian, Means performs with the group 49 Laughs Comedy. Other members include Pax Harvey, James Junes, Ernie Tsosie ii, and Adrianne Chalepah. His standup routines have strong ties back to his Native heritage. In one popular standup, he discusses how Native people tease each other ruthlessly and always solve any awkwardness with the phrase “Aaaayyyyeeee". In another, as he tries to explain email, his grandfather is horrified that he would throw spam into the trash.

Entrepreneur

Means was awarded the American Indian Business Leaders (AIBL) Entrepreneur of the year award in 2011. He created an original clothing line called “Tatanka Clothing”, which is intended to create cultural awareness for Native people and Native business people. In 2006, he appeared in a 21st Century Skins Native American Men's Calendar, which he also helped market.

Personal life 

Tatanka Means is one of ten children of activist Russell Means (Oglala Lakota) and his wife. His father as a young man was one of the leaders of the American Indian Movement in 1970 and later, which conducted large protests to raise awareness and educate mainstream Americans about Native American issues, civil rights issues, and demand for enforcement of treaties and gains in sovereignty by federally recognized tribes.  

The elder Means later performed as an actor. Russell Means appeared in Tiger Eyes, playing the terminally ill screen father of Tatanka's character. He died soon after filming ended. Tatanka Means carried his father's urn during the funeral.

Means' full Lakota name, Tatanka Wanbli Sapa Xila Sabe, means Black Buffalo Eagle.

Originally growing up with his mother in Chinle, Arizona, on the Navajo Nation, Means now lives with his own family in Rio Rancho, New Mexico. His wife Christine Means is a yoga instructor. The couple has one daughter.  Means is an advocate for sobriety and not using alcohol or drugs.

Filmography

Film

Television

Video games

References

External links 
 
 

1985 births
Living people
20th-century American male actors
21st-century American male actors
American male film actors
American male television actors
American male voice actors
Native American male actors
Native American actors
People from Apache County, Arizona
Actors from Arizona
Native American people from Arizona